In statistics and Markov modeling, an ancestral graph is a type of mixed graph  to provide a graphical representation for the result of marginalizing one or more vertices in a graphical model that takes the form of a directed acyclic graph.

Definition
Ancestral graphs are mixed graphs used  with three kinds of edges: directed edges, drawn as an arrow from one vertex to another, bidirected edges, which have an arrowhead at both ends, and undirected edges, which have no arrowheads. It is required to satisfy some additional constraints:
If there is an edge from a vertex u to another vertex v, with an arrowhead at v (that is, either an edge directed from u to v or a bidirected edge), then there does not exist a path from v to u consisting of undirected edges and/or directed edges oriented consistently with the path.
If a vertex v is an endpoint of an undirected edge, then it is not also the endpoint of an edge with an arrowhead at v.

Applications
Ancestral graphs are used to depict conditional independence relations between variables in Markov models.

References

Extensions and generalizations of graphs
Graphical models